Alessio Carlone (born 20 January 1996) is a Belgian former professional footballer who played as a winger.

Club career

Genk
Although Carlone is a youth product of Belgian club Genk, he never made his debut for the Belgian First Division A club. While on loan from Genk, Carlone made his professional debut in the Eerste Divisie for FC Den Bosch, on 31 January 2016, in a game against Sparta Rotterdam.

Eindhoven
In the summer of 2017, he joined FC Eindhoven, but a serious knee injury hampered his development.

Patro Eisden
On 13 February 2019, Carlone joined Belgian club Patro Eisden.

Politehnica Iași
On 26 June 2019, after only half a season in Belgium, Carlone joined Romanian club Politehnica Iași on a three-year deal. On 31 January 2020, Carlone was released by Politehnica Iași.

Botoșani
On 31 January 2020, Carlone joined Liga I side Botoșani. On 8 October 2020 he was forced to announce his immediate retirement from the game following a series of heart problems.

References

External links
 
 

1996 births
Living people
Belgian footballers
Association football midfielders
Liga I players
Eerste Divisie players
FC Den Bosch players
FC Eindhoven players
K. Patro Eisden Maasmechelen players
FC Politehnica Iași (2010) players
FC Botoșani players
Belgian expatriate footballers
Belgian expatriate sportspeople in the Netherlands
Expatriate footballers in the Netherlands
Belgian expatriate sportspeople in Romania
Expatriate footballers in Romania
Sportspeople from Genk
Footballers from Limburg (Belgium)